Abdullahi Sarki Mukhtar (born 5 July 1949, in Kano State, Nigeria) was formerly the National security adviser to the president of Nigeria. Rtd Major General Mukhtar was also a former military governor of Kaduna state and Katsina State, in the case of the latter he was the first administrator or governor.

Life and career
He had a fairly prominent army career culminating with his appointment as the general officer commanding the first division, Nigerian army in Kaduna state, before that, he was the Chief of Staff of a peace keeping force in Liberia.
The retired general was one of the few serving high-ranking officers in the middle of the 1990s who voiced concerns over the detention and trial of the former President Obasanjo and his former deputy Shehu Musa Yar'Adua.
He is known as a principled and charismatic officer who earned the respect of President Obasanjo when he refused to budge to the demands of Sani Abacha, on the treatment of coups suspects in 1995.
From January 23, 2002, to May 30, 2003, he administrated the Embassy of Nigeria in Moscow and was also accredited to Minsk.

References

1949 births
Nigerian generals
Living people
Governors of Katsina State
Governors of Kaduna State
Ambassadors of Nigeria to Russia